Bishampton is a village and civil parish in the Wychavon district of Worcestershire, England with a population of 625. It contains a church, a village shop and post office (which is now also a cafe), a hairdresser, a village hall with a park and children's play areas. Ounce, a local restaurant and bar opened their second location at the previous Dolphin pub in November 2022. This comes after opening their first location in Worcester in 2018. There is a Nature reserve and a cricket pitch within walking distance of the village. Fashion designer Stella McCartney lives near the village in the parish. Just outside  the village is a golf club with a 9 and 18 hole courses a driving range, and clubhouse and restaurant. 

In 2019, people from Bishampton and surrounding villages came together to share their opinions on the Throckmorton Airfield housing development. The development would bring over 2,000 houses to the area as well as schools, services and employment.

Demographics

Population 
Since 2001, the population has slightly declined from 678 to 675 in 2011 and down to 637 in 2021 according to UK Census data.

Gender 
The 2021 Census recorded that Bishampton had 331 males (52%) and 306 females (48%).

References

Villages in Worcestershire